Čude Canyon is a short but deep canyon created by the Stupčanica river in central-northeastern part of Bosnia and Herzegovina, in Olovo municipality. The Stupčanica cuts through steep slopes of Gradac, on the right bank, and Krševi, on the left, thus creating over a half of kilometer deep canyon (cca. 600 meters), only 3.8 kilometers long, and just few hundreds meters wide at the rim levels, while at the river level canyon is often only 2-3 meters wide. The Čude Canyon is protected natural monument of Bosnia and Herzegovina.

References

External links
 Čude Canyon in TV reportage (youtube.com)

Canyons and gorges of Bosnia and Herzegovina
Rivers of Bosnia and Herzegovina
Bosna basin
Krivaja (Bosna)
Protected areas of Bosnia and Herzegovina
Environment of Bosnia and Herzegovina